Charles Patterson House may refer to:

Charles Patterson House (Frankfort, Kentucky), listed on the NRHP in Kentucky
Charles Patterson House (Natchez, Mississippi), listed on the NRHP in Mississippi

See also
Patterson House (disambiguation)